Roberto Lazzarini (born 19 August 1961) is a Brazilian épée and foil fencer. He competed at the 1988 and 1992 Summer Olympics.

References

External links
 

1961 births
Living people
Brazilian male épée fencers
Olympic fencers of Brazil
Fencers at the 1988 Summer Olympics
Fencers at the 1992 Summer Olympics
Brazilian male foil fencers
20th-century Brazilian people